In geometry, a median of a triangle is a line segment joining a vertex to the midpoint of the opposite side, thus bisecting that side. Every triangle has exactly three medians, one from each vertex, and they all intersect each other at the triangle's centroid. In the case of isosceles and equilateral triangles, a median bisects any angle at a vertex whose two adjacent sides are equal in length.

The concept of a median extends to tetrahedra.

Relation to center of mass
Each median of a triangle passes through the triangle's centroid, which is the center of mass of an infinitely thin object of uniform density coinciding with the triangle. Thus the object would balance on the intersection point of the medians. The centroid is twice as close along any median to the side that the median intersects as it is to the vertex it emanates from.

Equal-area division

Each median divides the area of the triangle in half; hence the name, and hence a triangular object of uniform density would balance on any median. (Any other lines which divide the area of the triangle into two equal parts do not pass through the centroid.) The three medians divide the triangle into six smaller triangles of equal area.

Proof of equal-area property
Consider a triangle ABC.

By definition, .

We have:

Thus,  and 

Since , therefore, .
Using the same method, one can show that .

Three congruent triangles
In 2014 Lee Sallows discovered the following theorem:
The medians of any triangle dissect it into six equal area smaller triangles as in the figure above where three adjacent pairs of triangles meet at the midpoints D, E and F. If the two triangles in each such pair are rotated about their common midpoint until they meet so as to share a common side, then the three new triangles formed by the union of each pair are congruent.

Formulas involving the medians' lengths
The lengths of the medians can be obtained from Apollonius' theorem as:

These formulas imply the relationships:

Other properties

Let ABC be a triangle, let G be its centroid, and let D, E, and F be the midpoints of BC, CA, and AB, respectively. For any point P in the plane of ABC then 

The centroid divides each median into parts in the ratio 2:1, with the centroid being twice as close to the midpoint of a side as it is to the opposite vertex.

For any triangle with sides  and medians   

The medians of a right triangle with hypotenuse  satisfy 

If their semi-sum  is denoted by  then

Tetrahedron

A tetrahedron is a three-dimensional object having four triangular faces. A line segment joining a vertex of a tetrahedron with the centroid of the opposite face is called a median of the tetrahedron. There are four medians, and they are all concurrent at the centroid of the tetrahedron. As in the two-dimensional case, the centroid of the tetrahedron is the center of mass. However contrary to the two-dimensional case the centroid divides the medians not in a 2:1 ratio but in a 3:1 ratio (Commandino's theorem).

See also
Angle bisector
Altitude (triangle)
Automedian triangle

References

External links

 The Medians at cut-the-knot
 Area of Median Triangle at cut-the-knot
 Medians of a triangle With interactive animation
 Constructing a median of a triangle with compass and straightedge animated demonstration
 

Straight lines defined for a triangle
Articles containing proofs